Nationality words link to articles with information on the nation's poetry or literature (for instance, Irish or France).

Events

Works published
 William Dunbar,  publication year uncertain; also contains the author's "Lament for the Makaris", "Kynd Kittok", and "The Testament of Mr. Andro. Kennedy"; Great Britain
 The Jousts of May and June, anonymously published, publication year uncertain; Great Britain
 Jean Lemaire de Belges, Les Chansons de Namur, written in support of a popular revolt; Belgian Waloon poet writing in French
 Guntherus Ligurinis, a description of the battles Frederick Barbarossa fought with Milan whom the poet calls "Ligures", written by a 12th-century poet, found in a monastery by C. Celtis, who gave it to K. Peutinger, published by Chunrades Peutinger; republished in 1531 by J. Spiegel in Strasbourg, and in 1561 by Otto von Freising in Basel, Switzerland
 Baptista Mantuanus, an Italian, Latin-language poet:
 Parthenese, one of seven poems the author wrote with the same name, this one on St. Caecilia; Milan
 Mantuan Georgius, a poem on St. George, Milan
 , Milan
 Jean Marot, Le Voyage de Gênes

Births
Death years link to the corresponding "[year] in poetry" article:
 June 6 – Annibale Caro (died 1566), Italian
 October 7 – Guillaume Guéroult born about this year (died 1569), French editor, translator and poet
Also:
 Chang Chi-Hsiang (died 1587), Chinese poetry anthologist
 Girolamo Amalteo of Oderzo (died in 1574), Italian poet who wrote in Latin

Deaths
Birth years link to the corresponding "[year] in poetry" article:
 August 23 – Jean Molinet (born 1435), French poet, chronicler, and composer
 Petrus Crinitus, also known as "Pietro Crinito" (born 1474), Florentine Italian humanist scholar and poet who wrote verses in Latin

See also

 Poetry
 16th century in poetry
 16th century in literature
 French Renaissance literature
 Grands Rhétoriqueurs
 Renaissance literature
 Spanish Renaissance literature

Notes

16th-century poetry
Poetry